Gejza Kocsis (25 November 1910 – 12 March 1958) was a Czechoslovak-Hungarian footballer who played as a forward and appeared for both the Czechoslovakia and Hungary national teams.

Career
Kocsis earned his first and only cap for Czechoslovakia on 6 August 1933 in a friendly against Yugoslavia. He scored the opening goal of the match, which was played in Zagreb and finished as a 1–2 loss. He later represented the Hungary national team, making his first appearance on 11 April 1937 in the 1936–38 Central European International Cup against Switzerland, which finished as a 5–1 win Basel. He made his second and final appearance for Hungary on 25 April 1937  against Italy, also in the Central European International Cup, which finished as a 0–2 loss in Turin.

Personal life
Kocsis died on 12 March 1958 at the age of 47.

Career statistics

International

International goals

References

External links
 
 

1910 births
1958 deaths
Footballers from Bratislava
Czechoslovak footballers
Czechoslovakia international footballers
Hungarian footballers
Hungary international footballers
Dual internationalists (football)
Association football forwards
Teplitzer FK players
Bohemians 1905 players
Újpest FC players
Czechoslovak First League players
Nemzeti Bajnokság I players
People from the Kingdom of Hungary